You Are Me (French: Toi, c'est moi) is a 1936 French musical comedy film directed by René Guissart and starring Jacques Pills,  Georges Tabet, and Claude May. It is an operetta film based on a stage work of the same title. Pills and Tabet were paired in another film On the Road, released the same year.

The film's sets were designed by the art director René Renoux.

Cast
 Jacques Pills as Bobby Guibert - un fêtard impénitent, l'ami inséparable de Pat  
 Georges Tabet as Patrice 'Pat' Duvallon - un fêtard impénitent, l'ami inséparable de Bobby  
 André Berley as Pedro Hernandez  
 Claude May as Maricousa Hernandez  
 Louis Baron fils as Pfutz - le secrétaire  
 Junie Astor as Viviane Robinet  
 Pauline Carton as Honorine Guibert - la tante de Bobby  
 Saturnin Fabre as Adolphe Robinet - le résident  
 Paul Hams as Cicéron  
 Anaclara as Bédélia 
 Lucette Desmoulins 
 Odette Barencey 
 Claude Marty 
 Liliane Lesaffre

References

Bibliography 
 Dayna Oscherwitz & MaryEllen Higgins. The A to Z of French Cinema. Scarecrow Press, 2009.

External links 
 

1936 films
French musical comedy films
1936 musical comedy films
1930s French-language films
Films directed by René Guissart
Operetta films
French black-and-white films
1930s French films